In relation to nuclear explosions and other large bombs, ground zero (also called surface zero) is the point on the Earth's surface closest to a detonation. In the case of an explosion above the ground, ground zero is the point on the ground directly below the nuclear detonation and is sometimes called the hypocenter.

Generally, the terms ground zero and surface zero are also used in relation to earthquakes, epidemics, and other disasters to mark the point of the most severe damage or destruction. The term is distinguished from the term zero point in that the latter can also be located in the air, underground, or underwater.

Trinity, Hiroshima and Nagasaki

The origins of the term "ground zero" began with the Trinity test in Jornada del Muerto desert near Socorro, New Mexico, and the atomic bombings of Hiroshima and Nagasaki in Japan. The United States Strategic Bombing Survey of the atomic attacks, released in June 1946, used the term liberally, defining it as: "For convenience, the term 'ground zero' will be used to designate the point on the ground directly beneath the point of detonation, or 'air zero.'" William Laurence, an embedded reporter with the Manhattan Project, reported that "Zero" was "the code name given to the spot chosen for the [Trinity] test" in 1945.

The Oxford English Dictionary, citing the use of the term in a 1946 New York Times report on the destroyed city of Hiroshima, defines ground zero as "that part of the ground situated immediately under an exploding bomb, especially an atomic one."
The term was military slang, used at the Trinity site where the weapon tower for the first nuclear weapon was at "point zero", and moved into general use very shortly after the end of World War II.

The Pentagon

During the Cold War, The Pentagon, the headquarters of the United States Department of Defense in Arlington County, Virginia, was an assured target in the event of nuclear war. The open space in the center of the Pentagon became known informally as ground zero. A snack bar that used to be located at the center of this open space was nicknamed "Cafe Ground Zero".

World Trade Center

During the September 11 attacks in 2001, two aircraft were hijacked by 10 al-Qaeda terrorists and were flown into the Twin Towers of the World Trade Center in New York City, causing massive damage and starting fires that caused the weakened 110-story skyscrapers to collapse. The destroyed World Trade Center site soon became known as "ground zero". Rescue workers also used the phrase "The Pile", referring to the pile of rubble that was left after the buildings collapsed.

Even after the site was cleaned up and construction on the new One World Trade Center and the National September 11 Memorial & Museum were well under way, the term was still frequently used to refer to the site, as when opponents of the Park51 project that was to be located two blocks away from the site labeled it the "Ground Zero mosque".

In advance of the 10th anniversary of the attacks, New York City mayor Michael Bloomberg urged that the "ground zero" moniker be retired, saying, "…the time has come to call those  what they are: The World Trade Center and the National September 11th Memorial and Museum."

See also
List of nuclear weapon explosion sites

References

Atomic bombings of Hiroshima and Nagasaki
Cold War terminology
Metaphors referring to objects
Metaphors referring to places
Metaphors referring to war and violence
Military slang and jargon
September 11 attacks